James H. Watson (1845 – December 29, 1908) was an English-born merchant and political figure in Newfoundland. He represented Trinity Bay in the Newfoundland and Labrador House of Assembly from 1874 to 1882 and from 1893 to 1894.

He was born in Torquay and came to Newfoundland in 1869 where he entered business with his brother Ellis at Hant's Harbour. He was defeated when he ran for reelection in 1882. Watson set up business at L'Anse-au-Loup in 1890. He served as assistant clerk for the assembly from 1892 to 1893. He was elected again in 1893 and unseated by petition in 1894. In 1894, Watson was named a customs inspector at St. John's. He returned to England in 1904 and later died at Torquay in 1908.

References 
 

Members of the Newfoundland and Labrador House of Assembly
1845 births
1908 deaths
English emigrants to pre-Confederation Newfoundland
Newfoundland Colony people